Taraco is a peninsula jutting into Lake Wiñaymarka, the southern branch of Lake Titicaca in Bolivia. It is located in the La Paz Department, Ingavi Province, Tiwanaku Municipality, Taraco Canton. There is also a town of the same name on the peninsula.

As with many place names in the Titicaca  Basin, a corresponding Taraco District also exists on the Peruvian, northern side of the lake in the Huancané Province in Puno.

See also 
 Lukurmata

External links 
 Map of Ingavi Province showing the Taraco Peninsula

Peninsulas of Bolivia
Lake Titicaca
Landforms of La Paz Department (Bolivia)